Evercare Hospital Dhaka is a private hospital in Bangladesh and Part of Evercare group. It was previously called Apollo Hospital Dhaka.

History 
The hospital is located in Bashundhara Residential Area. In September 2015 Apollo Hospital was fined 1.6 million for having contraband pharmaceuticals. In December 2015 Apollo Hospital started online appointment and payment services. In 2016 the hospital carried out programs including in Jamuna Future Park to raise awareness on the World Heart Day. On 12 March 2016 an autologous stem cell transplantation was carried out in the hospital, the first successful one in Bangladesh. STS Holdings, the holding company of the hospital, held roadshows, over plans to make the hospital go public, for institutional investors. Apolo Dhaka in the flagship venture of STS Holding.

On 3 March 2017 Shahriar Hasnat Tapu, student of North South University, was injured in scuffle over parking in front of Apollo Hospital by Bashundhara security guards. He was treated at Apollo Hospital for injuries.

In 2020, the hospital was renamed Evercare Hospital Dhaka after being sold to the Evercare Group.

References 

Hospitals in Dhaka
Private hospitals in Bangladesh